The term diabetes includes several different metabolic disorders that all, if left untreated, result in abnormally high concentration of a sugar called glucose in the blood. Diabetes mellitus type 1 results when the pancreas no longer produces significant amounts of the hormone insulin, usually owing to the autoimmune destruction of the insulin-producing beta cells of the pancreas. Diabetes mellitus type 2, in contrast, is now thought to result from autoimmune attacks on the pancreas and/or insulin resistance. The pancreas of a person with type 2 diabetes may be producing normal or even abnormally large amounts of insulin. Other forms of diabetes mellitus, such as the various forms of maturity onset diabetes of the young, may represent some combination of insufficient insulin production and insulin resistance. Some degree of insulin resistance may also be present in a person with type 1 diabetes.

The main goal of diabetes management and control is, as far as possible, to restore carbohydrate metabolism to a normal state. To achieve this goal, individuals with an absolute deficiency of insulin require insulin replacement therapy, which is given through injections or an insulin pump. Insulin resistance, in contrast, can be corrected by dietary modifications and exercise. Other goals of diabetes management are to prevent or treat the many complications that can result from the disease itself and from its treatment.

Overview

Goals 
The treatment goals are related to effective control of blood glucose, blood pressure and lipids, to minimize the risk of long-term consequences associated with diabetes. They are suggested in clinical practice guidelines released by various national and international diabetes agencies.

The targets are:
 HbA1c of less than 6% or 7.0% if they are achievable without significant hypoglycemia
 Preprandial blood glucose: 3.9 to 7.2 mmol/L (70 to 130 mg/dL)
 2-hour postprandial blood glucose: <10 mmol/L (<180 mg/dL)

Goals should be individualized based on:
 Duration of diabetes
 Age/life expectancy
 Comorbidity
 Known cardiovascular disease or advanced microvascular disease
 Hypoglycemia awareness

In older patients, clinical practice guidelines by the American Geriatrics Society state "for frail older adults, persons with life expectancy of less than 5 years, and others in whom the risks of intensive glycemic control appear to outweigh the benefits, a less stringent target such as HbA1c of 8% is appropriate".

Issues

The primary issue requiring management is that of the glucose cycle. In this, glucose in the bloodstream is made available to cells in the body; a process dependent upon the twin cycles of glucose entering the bloodstream, and insulin allowing appropriate uptake into the body cells. Both aspects can require management. Another issue that ties along with the glucose cycle is getting a balanced amount of the glucose to the major organs so they are not affected negatively.

Complexities

The main complexities stem from the nature of the feedback loop of the glucose cycle, which is sought to be regulated:
 The glucose cycle is a system which is affected by two factors: entry of glucose into the bloodstream and also blood levels of insulin to control its transport out of the bloodstream
 As a system, it is sensitive to diet and exercise
 It is affected by the need for user anticipation due to the complicating effects of time delays between any activity and the respective impact on the glucose system
 Management is highly intrusive, and compliance is an issue, since it relies upon user lifestyle change and often upon regular sampling and measuring of blood glucose levels, multiple times a day in many cases
 It changes as people grow and develop
 It is highly individual

As diabetes is a prime risk factor for cardiovascular disease, controlling other risk factors which may give rise to secondary conditions, as well as the diabetes itself, is one of the facets of diabetes management. Checking cholesterol, LDL, HDL and triglyceride levels may indicate hyperlipoproteinemia, which may warrant treatment with hypolipidemic drugs. Checking the blood pressure and keeping it within strict limits (using diet and antihypertensive treatment) protects against the retinal, renal and cardiovascular complications of diabetes. Regular follow-up by a podiatrist or other foot health specialists is encouraged to prevent the development of diabetic foot.  Annual eye exams are suggested to monitor for progression of diabetic retinopathy.

Early advancements
Late in the 19th century, sugar in the urine (glycosuria) was associated with diabetes. Various doctors studied the connection.  Frederick Madison Allen studied diabetes in 1909–12, then published a large volume, Studies Concerning Glycosuria and Diabetes, (Boston,  1913).  He invented a fasting treatment for diabetes called the Allen treatment for diabetes.  His diet was an early attempt at managing diabetes.

Blood sugar level
Blood sugar level is measured by means of a glucose meter, with the result either in mg/dL (milligrams per deciliter in the US) or mmol/L (millimoles per litre in Canada and Eastern Europe) of blood. The average normal person has an average fasting glucose level of 4.5 mmol/L (81 mg/dL), with a lows of down to 2.5 and up to 5.4 mmol/L (65 to 98 mg/dL).

Optimal management of diabetes involves patients measuring and recording their own blood glucose levels. By keeping a diary of their own blood glucose measurements and noting the effect of food and exercise, patients can modify their lifestyle to better control their diabetes. For patients on insulin, patient involvement is important in achieving effective dosing and timing.

Hypo and hyperglycemia
Levels which are significantly above or below this range are problematic and can in some cases be dangerous. A level of <3.8 mmol/L (<70 mg/dL) is usually described as a hypoglycemic attack (low blood sugar). Most diabetics know when they are going to "go hypo" and usually are able to eat some food or drink something sweet to raise levels. A patient who is hyperglycemic (high glucose) can also become temporarily hypoglycemic, under certain conditions (e.g. not eating regularly, or after strenuous exercise, followed by fatigue).  Intensive efforts to achieve blood sugar levels close to normal have been shown to triple the risk of the most severe form of hypoglycemia, in which the patient requires assistance from by-standers in order to treat the episode.  In the United States, there were annually 48,500 hospitalizations for diabetic hypoglycemia and 13,100 for diabetic hypoglycemia resulting in coma in the period 1989 to 1991, before intensive blood sugar control was as widely recommended as today.  One study found that hospital admissions for diabetic hypoglycemia increased by 50% from 1990–1993 to 1997–2000, as strict blood sugar control efforts became more common. Among intensively controlled type 1 diabetics, 55% of episodes of severe hypoglycemia occur during sleep, and 6% of all deaths in diabetics under the age of 40 are from nocturnal hypoglycemia in the so-called 'dead-in-bed syndrome,' while National Institute of Health statistics show that 2% to 4% of all deaths in diabetics are from hypoglycemia. In children and adolescents following intensive blood sugar control, 21% of hypoglycemic episodes occurred without explanation.  In addition to the deaths caused by diabetic hypoglycemia, periods of severe low blood sugar can also cause permanent brain damage.  Although diabetic nerve disease is usually associated with hyperglycemia, hypoglycemia as well can initiate or worsen neuropathy in diabetics intensively struggling to reduce their hyperglycemia.

Levels greater than 13–15 mmol/L (230–270 mg/dL) are considered high, and should be monitored closely to ensure that they reduce rather than continue to remain high. The patient is advised to seek urgent medical attention as soon as possible if blood sugar levels continue to rise after 2–3 tests. High blood sugar levels are known as hyperglycemia, which is not as easy to detect as hypoglycemia and usually happens over a period of days rather than hours or minutes. If left untreated, this can result in diabetic coma and death.

Prolonged and elevated levels of glucose in the blood, which is left unchecked and untreated, will, over time, result in serious diabetic complications in those susceptible and sometimes even death. There is currently no way of testing for susceptibility to complications. Diabetics are therefore recommended to check their blood sugar levels either daily or every few days. There is also diabetes management software available from blood testing manufacturers which can display results and trends over time. Type 1 diabetics normally check more often, due to insulin therapy.

A history of blood sugar level results is especially useful for the diabetic to present to their doctor or physician in the monitoring and control of the disease. Failure to maintain a strict regimen of testing can accelerate symptoms of the condition, and it is therefore imperative that any diabetic patient strictly monitor their glucose levels regularly.

Glycemic control
Glycemic control is a medical term referring to the typical levels of blood sugar (glucose) in a person with diabetes mellitus. Much evidence suggests that many of the long-term complications of diabetes, especially the microvascular complications, result from many years of hyperglycemia (elevated levels of glucose in the blood). Good glycemic control, in the sense of a "target" for treatment, has become an important goal of diabetes care, although recent research suggests that the complications of diabetes may be caused by genetic factors or, in type 1 diabetics, by the continuing effects of the autoimmune disease which first caused the pancreas to lose its insulin-producing ability.

Because blood sugar levels fluctuate throughout the day and glucose records are imperfect indicators of these changes, the percentage of hemoglobin which is glycated is used as a proxy measure of long-term glycemic control in research trials and clinical care of people with diabetes. This test, the hemoglobin A1c or glycated hemoglobin reflects average glucose levels over the preceding 2–3 months. In nondiabetic persons with normal glucose metabolism the glycated hemoglobin is usually 4–6% by the most common methods (normal ranges may vary by method).

"Perfect glycemic control" would mean that glucose levels were always normal (70–130 mg/dL, or 3.9–7.2 mmol/L) and indistinguishable from a person without diabetes. In reality, because of the imperfections of treatment measures, even "good glycemic control" describes blood glucose levels that average somewhat higher than normal much of the time.  In addition, one survey of type 2 diabetics found that they rated the harm to their quality of life from intensive interventions to control their blood sugar to be just as severe as the harm resulting from intermediate levels of diabetic complications.

In the 1990s the American Diabetes Association conducted a publicity campaign to persuade patients and physicians to strive for average glucose and hemoglobin A1c values below 200 mg/dL (11 mmol/L) and 8%. Currently, many patients and physicians attempt to do better than that.

As of 2015 the guidelines called for an HbA1c of around 7% or a fasting glucose of less than 7.2 mmol/L (130 mg/dL); however these goals may be changed after professional clinical consultation, taking into account particular risks of hypoglycemia and life expectancy.  Despite guidelines recommending that intensive blood sugar control be based on balancing immediate harms and long-term benefits, many people – for example people with a life expectancy of less than nine years – who will not benefit are over-treated and do not experience clinically meaningful benefits.

Poor glycemic control refers to persistently elevated blood glucose and glycated hemoglobin levels, which may range from 200 to 500 mg/dL (11–28 mmol/L) and 9–15% or higher over months and years before severe complications occur. Meta-analysis of large studies done on the effects of tight vs. conventional, or more relaxed, glycemic control in type 2 diabetics have failed to demonstrate a difference in all-cause cardiovascular death, non-fatal stroke, or limb amputation, but decreased the risk of nonfatal heart attack by 15%. Additionally, tight glucose control decreased the risk of progression of retinopathy and nephropathy, and decreased the incidence peripheral neuropathy, but increased the risk of hypoglycemia 2.4 times.

Monitoring

Relying on their own perceptions of symptoms of hyperglycemia or hypoglycemia is usually unsatisfactory as mild to moderate hyperglycemia causes no obvious symptoms in nearly all patients. Other considerations include the fact that, while food takes several hours to be digested and absorbed, insulin administration can have glucose lowering effects for as little as 2 hours or 24 hours or more (depending on the nature of the insulin preparation used and individual patient reaction). In addition, the onset and duration of the effects of oral hypoglycemic agents vary from type to type and from patient to patient.

Personal (home) glucose monitoring
Control and outcomes of both types 1 and 2 diabetes may be improved by patients using home glucose meters to regularly measure their glucose levels. Glucose monitoring is both expensive (largely due to the cost of the consumable test strips) and requires significant commitment on the part of the patient. Lifestyle adjustments are generally made by the patients themselves following training by a clinician.

Regular blood testing, especially in type 1 diabetics, is helpful to keep adequate control of glucose levels and to reduce the chance of long term side effects of the disease. There are many (at least 20+) different types of blood monitoring devices available on the market today; not every meter suits all patients and it is a specific matter of choice for the patient, in consultation with a physician or other experienced professional, to find a meter that they personally find comfortable to use. The principle of the devices is virtually the same: a small blood sample is collected and measured. In one type of meter, the electrochemical, a small blood sample is produced by the patient using a lancet (a sterile pointed needle). The blood droplet is usually collected at the bottom of a test strip, while the other end is inserted in the glucose meter. This test strip contains various chemicals so that when the blood is applied, a small electrical charge is created between two contacts. This charge will vary depending on the glucose levels within the blood. In older glucose meters, the drop of blood is placed on top of a strip. A chemical reaction occurs and the strip changes color. The meter then measures the color of the strip optically.

Self-testing is clearly important in type I diabetes where the use of insulin therapy risks episodes of hypoglycemia and home-testing allows for adjustment of dosage on each administration. Its benefit in type 2 diabetes has been more controversial, but recent studies have resulted in guidance that self-monitoring does not improve blood glucose or quality of life.

Benefits of control and reduced hospital admission have been reported. However, patients on oral medication who do not self-adjust their drug dosage will miss many of the benefits of self-testing, and so it is questionable in this group. This is particularly so for patients taking monotherapy with metformin who are not at risk of hypoglycaemia. Regular 6 monthly laboratory testing of HbA1c (glycated haemoglobin) provides some assurance of long-term effective control and allows the adjustment of the patient's routine medication dosages in such cases. High frequency of self-testing in type 2 diabetes has not been shown to be associated with improved control. The argument is made, though, that type 2 patients with poor long term control despite home blood glucose monitoring, either have not had this integrated into their overall management, or are long overdue for tighter control by a switch from oral medication to injected insulin.

Continuous Glucose Monitoring (CGM)
CGM technology has been rapidly developing to give people living with diabetes an idea about the speed and direction of their glucose changes. While it still requires calibration from SMBG and is not indicated for use in correction boluses, the accuracy of these monitors is increasing with every innovation. The Libre Blood Sugar Diet Program utilizes the CGM and Libre Sensor and by collecting all the data through a smartphone and smartwatch experts analyze this data 24/7 in Real Time. The results are that certain foods can be identified as causing one's blood sugar levels to rise and other foods as safe foods- that do not make a person's blood sugar levels to rise. Each individual absorbs sugar differently and this is why testing is a necessity.

HbA1c test 
A useful test that has usually been done in a laboratory is the measurement of blood HbA1c levels. This is the ratio of glycated hemoglobin in relation to the total hemoglobin. Persistent raised plasma glucose levels cause the proportion of these molecules to go up. This is a test that measures the average amount of diabetic control over a period originally thought to be about 3 months (the average red blood cell lifetime), but more recently thought to be more strongly weighted to the most recent 2 to 4 weeks. In the non-diabetic, the HbA1c level ranges from 4.0 to 6.0%; patients with diabetes mellitus who manage to keep their HbA1c level below 6.5% are considered to have good glycemic control. The HbA1c test is not appropriate if there has been changes to diet or treatment within shorter time periods than 6 weeks or there is disturbance of red cell aging (e.g. recent bleeding or hemolytic anemia) or a hemoglobinopathy (e.g. sickle cell disease). In such cases, the alternative Fructosamine test is used to indicate average control in the preceding 2 to 3 weeks.

Continuous glucose monitoring

The first CGM device made available to consumers was the GlucoWatch biographer in 1999. This product is no longer sold. It was a retrospective device rather than live. Several live monitoring devices have subsequently been manufactured which provide ongoing monitoring of glucose levels on an automated basis during the day.

Digital tools

Electronic health records 
Sharing their electronic health records with people who have type 2 diabetes helps them to reduce their blood sugar levels. It is a way of helping people understand their own health condition and involving them actively in its management.

m-health monitoring applications 
The widespread use of smartphones has turned mobile applications (apps) into a popular means of the usage of all forms of software. As a consequence, the use of mobile apps in managing people's health and supporting their chronic conditions is receiving popularity, especially among healthcare systems, which are showing a great tendency toward using these apps to integrate patient-generated data into electronic health records, and to modify and improve treatment plans accordingly. The number of health-related apps accessible in the App Store and Google Play is approximately 100,000, and among these apps, the ones related to diabetes are the highest in number. Conducting regular self-management tasks such as medication and insulin intake, blood sugar checkup, diet observance, and physical exercise are really demanding. This is why the use of diabetes-related apps for the purposes of recording diet and medication intake or blood glucose level is promising to improve the health condition for the patients. However, despite the high number of apps, the rate of their usage among the patients is not high. One of the reasons for this could be due to the design problems that affect their usability. In addition, a 2016 study of 65 diabetes apps for Android revealed that sensitive data, such as insulin and blood glucose levels, "was routinely collected and shared with third parties".

Foot checking 
Monitoring a person's feet can help in predicting the likelihood of developing diabetic foot ulcers. A common method for this is using a special thermometer to look for spots on the foot that have higher temperature which indicate the possibility of an ulcer developing. At the same time there is no strong scientific evidence supporting the effectiveness of at-home foot temperature monitoring.

The current guideline in the United Kingdom recommends collecting 8-10 pieces of information for predicting the development of foot ulcers. A simpler method proposed by researchers provides a more detailed risk score based on three pieces of information (insensitivity, foot pulse, previous history of ulcers or amputation). This method is not meant to replace people regularly checking their own feet but complement it.

Lifestyle modification

The British National Health Service launched a programme targeting 100,000 people at risk of diabetes to lose weight and take more exercise in 2016.  In 2019 it was announced that the programme was successful. The 17,000 people who attended most of the healthy living sessions had, collectively lost nearly 60,000 kg, and the programme was to be doubled in size.

Diet

Because high blood sugar caused by poorly controlled diabetes can lead to a plethora of immediate and long-term complications, it is critical to maintain blood sugars as close to normal as possible, and a diet that produces more controllable glycemic variability is an important factor in producing normal blood sugars.

People with type 1 diabetes who use insulin can eat whatever they want, preferably a healthy diet with some carbohydrate content; in the long term it is helpful to eat a consistent amount of carbohydrate to make blood sugar management easier.

There is a lack of evidence of the usefulness of low-carbohydrate dieting for people with type 1 diabetes. Although for certain individuals it may be feasible to follow a low-carbohydrate regime combined with carefully managed insulin dosing, this is hard to maintain and there are concerns about potential adverse health effects caused by the diet. In general people with type 1 diabetes are advised to follow an individualized eating plan rather than a pre-decided one.

Computer assisted dietary history taking appears to just as applicable as oral or written dietary history taking, however there is lack of evidence showing effects on improving dietary habits, levels of HbA1c and overall management of diabetes.

Exercise 
Those who have type two diabetes are prone to having higher than normal blood sugar levels; one way to help manage these levels is through exercise. People diagnosed with type two diabetes can use exercise as a way to maintain their blood sugar and it has been shown to work just as well as medications.  Any physical activity can improve type two diabetes, whether that is walking, swimming, or dancing, any type of movement that burns calories.

People living with type two diabetes go through many challenges, one of those challenges is keeping on top of blood glucose levels. Exercise will not only improve blood sugar levels, but can also allow the body to be more sensitive to insulin, reduce the risk of heart disease and stroke which are common illnesses associated with diabetes. By exercising, the body becomes more sensitive to insulin allowing for better absorption of glucose by the muscle cells, not only during but up to 24 hours later as well. Through many studies, it has been made clear that exercise helps with glycemic control and has shown to lower HbA1c levels by approximately 4.2 mmol/mol (0.6%). Studies show that exercise along with diet can slow the rate of impaired glucose tolerance in those with type two diabetes. With that, it is recommended people with type two diabetes take part in 150 minutes on average of exercise a week.

There have not been studies that show how exercise can help manage blood glucose levels in those with type one diabetes. Studies on youth and young adults with type one diabetes where the HBA1c was monitored in both a controlled group and intervention group over a 1-3 month and even up to 5 month program showed no consistent effect on glycemic control. Possible factors that may affect the impact of exercise on management of glucose levels in type one diabetes are that energy consumption increases near time of exercise to account for possible hypoglycaemic episodes; this may be the reason type one diabetics do not see the lowering of glucose levels during exercise.  Those with type one diabetes are also prone to nocturnal hypoglycaemic episodes due to exercise as the translocation and expression of GLUT4, which is an insulin-regulated glucose transporter that is used to give glucose to muscle and fat cells, are increased by exercise. Those with type one diabetes may be more apprehensive of exercising out of fear of hypoglycaemia. Although exercise may not offer any direct benefit to lower blood glucose levels in those with type one diabetes, there are still many benefits such as a decreased risk of cardiovascular diseases, including blood pressure, lipid profiles, endothelial function, body composition and insulin sensitivity.

The two most effective forms of exercise for people with type two diabetes are aerobic and resistance training. Aerobic exercise has been shown to largely improve HbA1c, and contributes to weight loss and the enhanced metabolic regulation of lipids and lipoproteins. This may be any form of continuous exercise that elevates breathing and heart rate. A few popular forms of aerobic exercises include walking, cycling, hiking, swimming, rowing, tennis, and cardio classes like Zumba.

During the last 2 decades, resistance training has gained considerable recognition as an optimal form of exercise for patients with type two diabetes. The goal is to build muscle strength by lifting weights, training in calisthenics, yoga, or using weight machines. This form of exercise was linked to a 10% to 15% increase in strength, blood pressure, BMD health, insulin sensitivity, and muscle mass. Current diabetes guidelines recommend strength training two to three times per week in addition to aerobic activities.

The combination of aerobic and resistance training, as recommended by current ADA guidelines, is the most effective when it comes to controlling glucose and lipids in type two diabetes. During a review on 915 adults with diabetes it was reported that combination training was the most effective in reducing HbA1c instead of a singular form of exercise on its own. The American Diabetes Association recommends 150 minutes of moderate to vigorous aerobic exercise a week spread over three to seven days with no more than 2 days between each session paired with 2 to 3 nonconsecutive sessions of strength training. To maximize insulin sensitivity it is recommended to exercise daily. The Association claims that 75 minutes a week is sufficient for most physically fit or younger patients.

Not only does exercising regularly help manage blood sugar levels and weight, it helps reduce the risk of heart attack and stroke, improves cholesterol, reduces risk of diabetes related complications, increases the effect of insulin, provides a boost in energy levels, helps reduce stress and contributes to positive self-esteem. Although incredibly beneficial, the results begin to fade within 48 to 96 hours.Therefore, an ongoing exercise program is required to maintain the health benefits associated with these forms of training.

Medications

Currently, one goal for diabetics is to avoid or minimize chronic diabetic complications, as well as to avoid acute problems of hyperglycemia or hypoglycemia. Adequate control of diabetes leads to lower risk of complications associated with unmonitored diabetes including kidney failure (requiring dialysis or transplant), blindness, heart disease and limb amputation. The most prevalent form of medication is hypoglycemic treatment through either oral hypoglycemics and/or insulin therapy. There is emerging evidence that full-blown diabetes mellitus type 2 can be evaded in those with only mildly impaired glucose tolerance.

Patients with type 1 diabetes mellitus require direct injection of insulin as their bodies cannot produce enough (or even any) insulin. As of 2010, there is no other clinically available form of insulin administration other than injection for patients with type 1: injection can be done by insulin pump, by jet injector, or any of several forms of hypodermic needle. Non-injective methods of insulin administration have been unattainable as the insulin protein breaks down in the digestive tract. There are several insulin application mechanisms under experimental development as of 2004, including a capsule that passes to the liver and delivers insulin into the bloodstream. There have also been proposed vaccines for type I using glutamic acid decarboxylase (GAD), but these are currently not being tested by the pharmaceutical companies that have sublicensed the patents to them.

For type 2 diabetics, diabetic management consists of a combination of diet, exercise, and weight loss, in any achievable combination depending on the patient. Obesity is very common in type 2 diabetes and contributes greatly to insulin resistance. Weight reduction and exercise improve tissue sensitivity to insulin and allow its proper use by target tissues. Patients who have poor diabetic control after lifestyle modifications are typically placed on oral hypoglycemics. Some Type 2 diabetics eventually fail to respond to these and must proceed to insulin therapy. A study conducted in 2008 found that increasingly complex and costly diabetes treatments are being applied to an increasing population with type 2 diabetes. Data from 1994 to 2007 was analyzed and it was found that the mean number of diabetes medications per treated patient increased from 1.14 in 1994 to 1.63 in 2007.

Patient education and compliance with treatment is very important in managing the disease. Improper use of medications and insulin can be very dangerous causing hypo- or hyper-glycemic episodes.

Insulin

For type 1 diabetics, there will always be a need for insulin injections throughout their life, as the pancreatic beta cells of a type 1 diabetic are not capable of producing sufficient insulin. However, both type 1 and type 2 diabetics can see dramatic improvements in blood sugars through modifying their diet, and some type 2 diabetics can fully control the disease by dietary modification.

Insulin therapy requires close monitoring and a great deal of patient education, as improper administration is quite dangerous. For example, when food intake is reduced, less insulin is required. A previously satisfactory dosing may be too much if less food is consumed causing a hypoglycemic reaction if not intelligently adjusted. Exercise decreases insulin requirements as exercise increases glucose uptake by body cells whose glucose uptake is controlled by insulin, and vice versa. In addition, there are several types of insulin with varying times of onset and duration of action.

Several companies are  currently working to develop a non-invasive version of insulin, so that injections can be avoided.  Mannkind has developed an inhalable version, while companies like Novo Nordisk, Oramed and BioLingus have efforts undergoing for an oral product.   Also oral combination products of insulin and a GLP-1 agonist are being developed.

Insulin therapy creates risk because of the inability to continuously know a person's blood glucose level and adjust insulin infusion appropriately.  New advances in technology have overcome much of this problem.  Small, portable insulin infusion pumps are available from several manufacturers.  They allow a continuous infusion of small amounts of insulin to be delivered through the skin around the clock, plus the ability to give bolus doses when a person eats or has elevated blood glucose levels.  This is very similar to how the pancreas works, but these pumps lack a continuous "feed-back" mechanism.  Thus, the user is still at risk of giving too much or too little insulin unless blood glucose measurements are made.

A further danger of insulin treatment is that while diabetic microangiopathy is usually explained as the result of hyperglycemia, studies in rats indicate that the higher than normal level of insulin diabetics inject to control their hyperglycemia may itself promote small blood vessel disease.  While there is no clear evidence that controlling hyperglycemia reduces diabetic macrovascular and cardiovascular disease, there are indications that intensive efforts to normalize blood glucose levels may worsen cardiovascular and cause diabetic mortality.

Driving

Studies conducted in the United States and Europe showed that drivers with type 1 diabetes had twice as many collisions as their non-diabetic spouses, demonstrating the increased risk of driving collisions in the type 1 diabetes population. Diabetes can compromise driving safety in several ways. First, long-term complications of diabetes can interfere with the safe operation of a vehicle. For example, diabetic retinopathy (loss of peripheral vision or visual acuity), or peripheral neuropathy (loss of feeling in the feet) can impair a driver's ability to read street signs, control the speed of the vehicle, apply appropriate pressure to the brakes, etc.

Second, hypoglycemia can affect a person's thinking process, coordination, and state of consciousness. This disruption in brain functioning is called neuroglycopenia. Studies have demonstrated that the effects of neuroglycopenia impair driving ability. A study involving people with type 1 diabetes found that individuals reporting two or more hypoglycemia-related driving mishaps differ physiologically and behaviorally from their counterparts who report no such mishaps. For example, during hypoglycemia, drivers who had two or more mishaps reported fewer warning symptoms, their driving was more impaired, and their body released less epinephrine (a hormone that helps raise BG). Additionally, individuals with a history of hypoglycemia-related driving mishaps appear to use sugar at a faster rate and are relatively slower at processing information. These findings indicate that although anyone with type 1 diabetes may be at some risk of experiencing disruptive hypoglycemia while driving, there is a subgroup of type 1 drivers who are more vulnerable to such events.

Given the above research findings, it is recommended that drivers with type 1 diabetes with a history of driving mishaps should never drive when their BG is less than 70 mg/dL (3.9 mmol/L). Instead, these drivers are advised to treat hypoglycemia and delay driving until their BG is above 90 mg/dL (5 mmol/L). Such drivers should also learn as much as possible about what causes their hypoglycemia, and use this information to avoid future hypoglycemia while driving.

Studies funded by the National Institutes of Health (NIH) have demonstrated that face-to-face training programs designed to help individuals with type 1 diabetes better anticipate, detect, and prevent extreme BG can reduce the occurrence of future hypoglycemia-related driving mishaps. An internet-version of this training has also been shown to have significant beneficial results. Additional NIH funded research to develop internet interventions specifically to help improve driving safety in drivers with type 1 diabetes is currently underway.

Exenatide

The U.S. Food and Drug Administration (FDA) has approved a treatment called Exenatide, based on the saliva of a Gila monster, to control blood sugar in patients with type 2 diabetes.

Other regimens
Artificial Intelligence researcher Dr. Cynthia Marling, of the Ohio University Russ College of Engineering and Technology, in collaboration with the Appalachian Rural Health Institute Diabetes Center, is developing a case-based reasoning system to aid in diabetes management.  The goal of the project is to provide automated intelligent decision support to diabetes patients and their professional care providers by interpreting the ever-increasing quantities of data provided by current diabetes management technology and translating it into better care without time-consuming manual effort on the part of an endocrinologist or diabetologist. This type of Artificial Intelligence-based treatment shows some promise with initial testing of a prototype system producing best practice treatment advice which anaylizing physicians deemed to have some degree of benefit over 70% of the time and advice of neutral benefit another nearly 25% of the time.

Use of a "Diabetes Coach" is becoming an increasingly popular way to manage diabetes. A Diabetes Coach is usually a Certified diabetes educator (CDE) who is trained to help people in all aspects of caring for their diabetes. The CDE can advise the patient on diet, medications, proper use of insulin injections and pumps, exercise, and other ways to manage diabetes while living a healthy and active lifestyle. CDEs can be found locally or by contacting a company which provides personalized diabetes care using CDEs. Diabetes Coaches can speak to a patient on a pay-per-call basis or via a monthly plan.

Dental care 
High blood glucose in diabetic people is a risk factor for developing gum and tooth problems, especially in post-puberty and aging individuals. Diabetic patients have greater chances of developing oral health problems such as tooth decay, salivary gland dysfunction, fungal infections, inflammatory skin disease, periodontal disease or taste impairment and thrush of the mouth. The oral problems in persons with diabetes can be prevented with a good control of the blood sugar levels, regular check-ups and a very good oral hygiene. By maintaining a good oral status, diabetic persons prevent losing their teeth as a result of various periodontal conditions.

Diabetic persons must increase their awareness about oral infections as they have a double impact on health. Firstly, people with diabetes are more likely to develop periodontal disease, which causes increased blood sugar levels, often leading to diabetes complications. Severe periodontal disease can increase blood sugar, contributing to increased periods of time when the body functions with a high blood sugar. This puts diabetics at increased risk for diabetic complications.

The first symptoms of gum and tooth infection in diabetic persons are decreased salivary flow and burning mouth or tongue. Also, patients may experience signs like dry mouth, which increases the incidence of decay. Poorly controlled diabetes usually leads to gum recession, since plaque creates more harmful proteins in the gums.

Tooth decay and cavities are some of the first oral problems that individuals with diabetes are at risk for. Increased blood sugar levels translate into greater sugars and acids that attack the teeth and lead to gum diseases. Gingivitis can also occur as a result of increased blood sugar levels along with an inappropriate oral hygiene. Periodontitis is an oral disease caused by untreated gingivitis and which destroys the soft tissue and bone that support the teeth. This disease may cause the gums to pull away from the teeth which may eventually loosen and fall out. Diabetic people tend to experience more severe periodontitis because diabetes lowers the ability to resist infection and also slows healing. At the same time, an oral infection such as periodontitis can make diabetes more difficult to control because it causes the blood sugar levels to rise.

To prevent further diabetic complications as well as serious oral problems, diabetic persons must keep their blood sugar levels under control and have a proper oral hygiene. A study in the Journal of Periodontology found that poorly controlled type 2 diabetic patients are more likely to develop periodontal disease than well-controlled diabetics are.  At the same time, diabetic patients are recommended to have regular checkups with a dental care provider at least once in three to four months. Diabetics who receive good dental care and have good insulin control typically have a better chance at avoiding gum disease to help prevent tooth loss.

Dental care is therefore even more important for diabetic patients than for healthy individuals. Maintaining the teeth and gum healthy is done by taking some preventing measures such as regular appointments at a dentist and a very good oral hygiene. Also, oral health problems can be avoided by closely monitoring the blood sugar levels. Patients who keep better under control their blood sugar levels and diabetes are less likely to develop oral health problems when compared to diabetic patients who control their disease moderately or poorly.

Poor oral hygiene is a great factor to take under consideration when it comes to oral problems and even more in people with diabetes. Diabetic people are advised to brush their teeth at least twice a day, and if possible, after all meals and snacks. However, brushing in the morning and at night is mandatory as well as flossing and using an anti-bacterial mouthwash. Individuals with diabetes are recommended to use toothpaste that contains fluoride as this has proved to be the most efficient in fighting oral infections and tooth decay. Flossing must be done at least once a day, as well because it is helpful in preventing oral problems by removing the plaque between the teeth, which is not removed when brushing.

Diabetic patients must get professional dental cleanings every six months. In cases when dental surgery is needed, it is necessary to take some special precautions such as adjusting diabetes medication or taking antibiotics to prevent infection. Looking for early signs of gum disease (redness, swelling, bleeding gums) and informing the dentist about them is also helpful in preventing further complications. Quitting smoking is recommended to avoid serious diabetes complications and oral diseases.

Diabetic persons are advised to make morning appointments to the dental care provider as during this time of the day the blood sugar levels tend to be better kept under control. Not least, individuals with diabetes must make sure both their physician and dental care provider are informed and aware of their condition, medical history and periodontal status.

Medication nonadherence
Because many patients with diabetes have two or more comorbidities, they often require multiple medications. The prevalence of medication nonadherence is high among patients with chronic conditions, such as diabetes, and nonadherence is associated with public health issues and higher health care costs. One reason for nonadherence is the cost of medications. Being able to detect cost-related nonadherence is important for health care professionals, because this can lead to strategies to assist patients with problems paying for their medications. Some of these strategies are use of generic drugs or therapeutic alternatives, substituting a prescription drug with an over-the-counter medication, and pill-splitting. Interventions to improve adherence can achieve reductions in diabetes morbidity and mortality, as well as significant cost savings to the health care system. Smartphone apps have been found to improve self-management and health outcomes in people with diabetes through functions such as specific reminder alarms, while working with mental health professionals has also been found to help people with diabetes develop the skills to manage their medications and challenges of self-management effectively.

Psychological mechanisms and adherence
As self-management of diabetes typically involves lifestyle modifications, adherence may pose a significant self-management burden on many individuals. For example, individuals with diabetes may find themselves faced with the need to self-monitor their blood glucose levels, adhere to healthier diets and maintain exercise regimens regularly in order to maintain metabolic control and reduce the risk of developing cardiovascular problems. Barriers to adherence have been associated with key psychological mechanisms: knowledge of self-management, beliefs about the efficacy of treatment and self-efficacy/perceived control. Such mechanisms are inter-related, as one's thoughts (e.g. one's perception of diabetes, or one's appraisal of how helpful self-management is) is likely to relate to one's emotions (e.g. motivation to change), which in turn, affects one's self-efficacy (one's confidence in their ability to engage in a behaviour to achieve a desired outcome).

As diabetes management is affected by an individual's emotional and cognitive state, there has been evidence suggesting the self-management of diabetes is negatively affected by diabetes-related distress and depression. There is growing evidence that there is higher levels of clinical depression in patients with diabetes compared to the non-diabetic population. Depression in individuals with diabetes has been found to be associated with poorer self-management of symptoms. This suggests that it may be important to target mood in treatment. In the case of children and young people, especially if they are socially disadvantaged, research suggests that it is important that healthcare providers listen to and discuss their feelings and life situation to help them engage with diabetes services and self-management.

To this end, treatment programs such as the Cognitive Behavioural Therapy - Adherence and Depression program (CBT-AD) have been developed to target the psychological mechanisms underpinning adherence. By working on increasing motivation and challenging maladaptive illness perceptions, programs such as CBT-AD aim to enhance self-efficacy and improve diabetes-related distress and one's overall quality of life.

Research

Type 1 diabetes
Diabetes type 1 is caused by the destruction of enough beta cells to produce symptoms; these cells, which are found in the Islets of Langerhans in the pancreas, produce and secrete insulin, the single hormone responsible for allowing glucose to enter from the blood into cells (in addition to the hormone amylin, another hormone required for glucose homeostasis). Hence, the phrase "curing diabetes type 1" means "causing a maintenance or restoration of the endogenous ability of the body to produce insulin in response to the level of blood glucose" and cooperative operation with counterregulatory hormones.

This section deals only with approaches for curing the underlying condition of diabetes type 1, by enabling the body to endogenously, in vivo, produce insulin in response to the level of blood glucose. It does not cover other approaches, such as, for instance, closed-loop integrated glucometer/insulin pump products, which could potentially increase the quality-of-life for some who have diabetes type 1, and may by some be termed "artificial pancreas".

Encapsulation approach 

A biological approach to the artificial pancreas is to implant bioengineered tissue containing islet cells, which would secrete the amounts of insulin, amylin and glucagon needed in response to sensed glucose.

When islet cells have been transplanted via the Edmonton protocol, insulin production (and glycemic control) was restored, but at the expense of continued immunosuppression drugs. Encapsulation of the islet cells in a protective coating has been developed to block the immune response to transplanted cells, which relieves the burden of immunosuppression and benefits the longevity of the transplant.

Stem cells 
Research is being done at several locations in which islet cells are developed from stem cells.

Stem cell research has also been suggested as a potential avenue for a cure since it may permit regrowth of Islet cells which are genetically part of the treated individual, thus perhaps eliminating the need for immuno-suppressants.[48] This new method autologous nonmyeloablative hematopoietic stem cell transplantation was developed by a research team composed by Brazilian and American scientists (Dr. Julio Voltarelli, Dr. Carlos Eduardo Couri, Dr Richard Burt, and colleagues) and it was the first study to use stem cell therapy in human diabetes mellitus This was initially tested in mice and in 2007 there was the first publication of stem cell therapy to treat this form of diabetes. Until 2009, there was 23 patients included and followed for a mean period of 29.8 months (ranging from 7 to 58 months). In the trial, severe immunosuppression with high doses of cyclophosphamide and anti-thymocyte globulin is used with the aim of "turning off" the immunologic system", and then autologous hematopoietic stem cells are reinfused to regenerate a new one. In summary it is a kind of "immunologic reset" that blocks the autoimmune attack against residual pancreatic insulin-producing cells. Until December 2009, 12 patients remained continuously insulin-free for periods ranging from 14 to 52 months and 8 patients became transiently insulin-free for periods ranging from 6 to 47 months. Of these last 8 patients, 2 became insulin-free again after the use of sitagliptin, a DPP-4 inhibitor approved only to treat type 2 diabetic patients and this is also the first study to document the use and complete insulin-independendce in humans with type 1 diabetes with this medication. In parallel with insulin suspension, indirect measures of endogenous insulin secretion revealed that it significantly increased in the whole group of patients, regardless the need of daily exogenous insulin use.

Gene therapy 

Technology for gene therapy is advancing rapidly such that there are multiple pathways possible to support endocrine function, with potential to practically cure diabetes.

 Gene therapy can be used to manufacture insulin directly: an oral medication, consisting of viral vectors containing the insulin sequence, is digested and delivers its genes to the upper intestines. Those intestinal cells will then behave like any viral infected cell, and will reproduce the insulin protein. The virus can be controlled to infect only the cells which respond to the presence of glucose, such that insulin is produced only in the presence of high glucose levels. Due to the limited numbers of vectors delivered, very few intestinal cells would actually be impacted and would die off naturally in a few days. Therefore, by varying the amount of oral medication used, the amount of insulin created by gene therapy can be increased or decreased as needed. As the insulin-producing intestinal cells die off, they are boosted by additional oral medications.
 Gene therapy might eventually be used to cure the cause of beta cell destruction, thereby curing the new diabetes patient before the beta cell destruction is complete and irreversible.
 Gene therapy can be used to turn duodenum cells and duodenum adult stem cells into beta cells which produce insulin and amylin naturally. By delivering beta cell DNA to the intestine cells in the duodenum, a few intestine cells will turn into beta cells, and subsequently adult stem cells will develop into beta cells. This makes the supply of beta cells in the duodenum self-replenishing, and the beta cells will produce insulin in proportional response to carbohydrates consumed.

Monoclonal antibodies 

In November 2022 the FDA approved Teplizumab a monoclonal antibody drug which aims to delay type 1 diabetes by reprogramming the immune system to stop mistakenly attacking pancreatic cells.

Type 2 diabetes
Type 2 diabetes is usually first treated by increasing physical activity, and eliminating saturated fat and reducing sugar and carbohydrate intake with a goal of losing weight.   These can restore insulin sensitivity even when the weight loss is modest, for example around 5 kg (10 to 15 lb), most especially when it is in abdominal fat deposits.  Diets that are very low in saturated fats have been claimed to reverse insulin resistance.

Cognitive Behavioural Therapy is an effective intervention for improving adherence to medication, depression and glycaemic control, with enduring and clinically meaningful benefits for diabetes self-management and glycaemic control in adults with type 2 diabetes and comorbid depression.

Testosterone replacement therapy may improve glucose tolerance and insulin sensitivity in diabetic hypogonadal men. The mechanisms by which testosterone decreases insulin resistance is under study. Moreover, testosterone may have a protective effect on pancreatic beta cells, which is possibly exerted by androgen-receptor-mediated mechanisms and influence of inflammatory cytokines.

Recently it has been suggested that a type of gastric bypass surgery may normalize blood glucose levels in 80–100% of severely obese patients with diabetes. The precise causal mechanisms are being intensively researched; its results may not simply be attributable to weight loss, as the improvement in blood sugars seems to precede any change in body mass. This approach may become a treatment for some people with type 2 diabetes, but has not yet been studied in prospective clinical trials. This surgery may have the additional benefit of reducing the death rate from all causes by up to 40% in severely obese people. A small number of normal to moderately obese patients with type 2 diabetes have successfully undergone similar operations.

MODY is a rare genetic form of diabetes, often mistaken for Type 1 or Type 2. The medical management is variable and depends on each individual case.

Several immunosuppressive drugs targeting the chronic inflammation in type 2 diabetes have been tested.

See also 

 Ambulatory care sensitive conditions
 Diabetic coma
 Diabetic hypoglycemia
 Diabetic hypoglycemia journal
 Glycemic efficacy
 Latent autoimmune diabetes of adults

References

External links 
 American College of Physicians Diabetes Portal – Resources for patients and clinicians
 American Diabetes Association
 Prevent Diabetes Problems: Keep Your Diabetes Under Control – Self-care tips at the United States "National Diabetes Information Clearinghouse"

Diabetes